Aghadrumsee St Macartan's is a Gaelic Athletic Association club based in the village of Aghadrumsee, County Fermanagh, Northern Ireland.

History
The club was founded in 1954, and won the Fermanagh Senior Football Championship for the first time in 1961. It remains their only senior triumph to date.

The club's most recent success came at the junior grade, winning the championship in 2018. Aghadrumsee went one game away from reaching the final of the Ulster Junior Club Football Championship, losing to Limavady in the semi-final.

Honours
 Fermanagh Senior Football Championship (1): 1961
 Fermanagh Intermediate Football Championship (2): 1985, 1990
 Fermanagh Junior Football Championship (2): 1955, 2018

References

Gaelic football clubs in County Fermanagh
Gaelic games clubs in County Fermanagh